The 1953 Honduran Amateur League was the seventh edition of the Honduran Amateur League.  C.D. Federal obtained its 1st national title.  The season ran from 3 May to 27 September 1953.

Regional champions

Known results

National championship round
Played in a double round-robin format between the regional champions.  Also known as the Cuadrangular.

Known results

Federal's lineup

References

Liga Amateur de Honduras seasons
Honduras
1953 in Honduras